Perfect Strangers is an American sitcom created by Dale McRaven which aired on ABC in the United States. It chronicles the rocky coexistence of Larry Appleton (Mark Linn-Baker) and his distant cousin Balki Bartokomous (Bronson Pinchot).

The show began in the spring of 1986, and concluded with the eighth season in summer 1993. Originally airing on Tuesdays and then Wednesdays in prime time, the show eventually found its niche as an anchor for ABC's original TGIF Friday night lineup.

The series ran for 150 episodes, concluding with the two-part series finale on August 6, 1993.

Series overview

Episodes

Season 1 (1986)

Season 2 (1986–87)

Season 3 (1987–88)

Season 4 (1988–89)

Season 5 (1989–90)

Season 6 (1990–91)

Season 7 (1991–92)

Season 8 (1993)

References

Perfect Strangers